Miss USA 1974 was the 23rd Miss USA pageant, televised live by CBS from Niagara Falls, New York on May 18, 1974.

The pageant was won by Karen Morrison of Illinois, who was crowned by outgoing titleholder Amanda Jones, also of Illinois.  Morrison was the fourth woman from Illinois to win the Miss USA title (a record at the time), and went on to place as a semi-finalist at Miss Universe 1974. Coincidentally, first runner up at Miss USA 1973 was Miss New York. It happened again at Miss USA 1974 when Miss New York (Miss USA 1973 & Miss USA 1974 held in New York) was first runner up with both winner from Illinois.

Results

Placements

Special awards

Historical significance 
 Illinois wins competition for the fourth time and twice in a row. 
 New York earns the 1st runner-up position for the fifth time. The last time it placed this was in 1973. It reaches the same position as the two previous year. 
 Wisconsin earns the 2nd runner-up position for the first time and it reaches its highest placement ever at the contest.
 California earns the 3rd runner-up position for the third time. The last time it placed this was in 1962.
 North Carolina earns the 4th runner-up position for the first time.
 States that placed in semifinals the previous year were Arizona, California, District of Columbia, Florida, Illinois, Louisiana and New York.
 California placed for the eighteenth consecutive year.
 Florida placed for the sixth consecutive year. 
 District of Columbia placed for the fifth consecutive year. 
 Louisiana and New York placed for the third consecutive year.
 Arizona and Illinois made their second consecutive placement.
 North Carolina last placed in 1972.
 Missouri last placed in 1971.
 Nevada last placed in 1970.
 Wisconsin last placed in 1967.
 South Dakota last placed in 1958.

Delegates
The Miss USA 1974 delegates were:

 Alabama - Wyna Lavas
 Alaska - Cindy Dickerson
 Arizona - Carlys Peterson
 Arkansas - Gina Huddle
 California - Gayle Gorrell
 Colorado - Connie Larsen
 Connecticut - Valerie Cappello
 Delaware - Cheryl Fetkenher
 District of Columbia - Robin Utterback
 Florida - Cynthia Zach
 Georgia - Vicki Ross
 Hawaii - Joan Ottensmeyer
 Idaho - Darla Jan Dowden
 Illinois - Karen Morrison
 Indiana - Lisa Childress
 Iowa - Susan Thompson
 Kansas - Lorraine Breckenridge
 Kentucky - Charlesy Gulick
 Louisiana - Karen Hoff
 Maine - Rebecca Titcomb
 Maryland - Mary Jo Ruppert
 Massachusetts - Esthellean Hicks
 Michigan - Patty Loftis
 Minnesota - Gayle Johnson
 Mississippi - Denise Clark
 Missouri - Dorothy McAlveen

 Montana - Carol Aalseth
 Nebraska - Mary Wolff
 Nevada - Linda Dryden
 New Hampshire - June Tedeschi
 New Jersey - Pat Sims
 New Mexico - Jan Nilsson
 New York - Barbara Cooper
 North Carolina - Marcia Burton
 North Dakota - Judy Waltz
 Ohio - Kay Phillips
 Oklahoma - Yugonda Willits
 Oregon - Peggy Ann Gerding
 Pennsylvania - Dorisann Gatalski
 Rhode Island - Debra Cerroni
 South Carolina - Lynn Hollis
 South Dakota - Debra Ann Brickley
 Tennessee - Brin Hendrix
 Texas - Debra Cronin
 Utah - Halene Petersen
 Vermont - Donna Thornton
 Virginia - Hazel Thomas
 Washington - Cheryl Rutledge
 West Virginia - Kim Nuzum
 Wisconsin - Mary Cook
 Wyoming - Debbie Petty

External links 
 

1974
May 1974 events in the United States
1974 beauty pageants
1974 in New York (state)